The 2017 Úrvalsdeild kvenna was the 46th season of the women's football top level league in Iceland. Stjarnan was the defending champion. The season began on 27 April and concluded on 29 September. Þór/KA were crowned champions.

Teams

The 2017 Úrvalsdeild kvenna was contested by ten teams, eight of which played in the division the previous year and two teams promoted from 1. deild kvenna. The bottom two teams from the previous season, Selfoss and ÍA Akranes, were relegated to the 2017 1. deild kvenna and were replaced by Grindavík and Haukar, champions and runners-up of the 2016 1. deild kvenna respectively.

Club information

Source: Scoresway

League table

Results
Each team will play home and away once against every other team for a total of 18 games played each.

Top goalscorers

References

External links
 Official website
 Season on soccerway.com

Icell
Icell
1
2017